Leucodontaceae is a family of mosses belonging to the order Hypnales.

Genera

Genera:
 Alsia Sull.
 Antitrichia Brid.
 Bestia Broth.

References

Hypnales
Moss families